Kara Elizabeth DioGuardi (born December 9, 1970) is an American songwriter, record producer, music publisher, A&R executive, and singer. She writes music primarily in the pop rock genre. DioGuardi has worked with many popular artists; sales of albums on which her songs appear exceed 160 million worldwide. DioGuardi is a 2011 NAMM Music for Life Award winner, 2009 NMPA Songwriter Icon Award winner, 2007 BMI Pop Songwriter of the Year, and has received 20 BMI Awards for co-writing the most performed songs on the radio.

DioGuardi served as a judge on American Idol for its eighth and ninth seasons. In 2008, she was appointed to the position of executive vice president of talent development at Warner Bros. Records, and has signed acts such as Jason Derulo and Iyaz. In 2011, she was a head judge on the Bravo singer-songwriter competition series Platinum Hit.

Early life 
DioGuardi was born in Ossining, New York. She is descended from Roman Catholic Arbëreshë/Albanian from Italy. Her father is former Republican Congressman and 2010 US Senate candidate Joe DioGuardi.  Her mother Carol died in 1997 after a seven-year battle with ovarian cancer.

DioGuardi grew up in the Wilmot Woods section of suburban New Rochelle, New York, and attended elementary school at the Immaculate Heart of Mary Catholic School in Scarsdale, New York, followed by The Masters School in Dobbs Ferry, New York, before earning a degree in political science at Duke University. After graduating from college, she worked for Billboard magazine as an assistant to Timothy White and Howard Lander and later as an advertising sales representative.

Career

Professional songwriting 
DioGuardi has a songwriting catalog of several hundred songs, of which over 300 have been released on major labels worldwide, and over 150 have appeared on platinum selling albums.  She has had 50 international charting singles over the course of her career, and her songs have helped propel more than 66 albums into the Top Ten of the Billboard 200.  Her songs have been featured in major motion pictures, television shows, film soundtracks, and radio spots, as well as national and international commercial campaigns.

She wrote with Ashlee Simpson for her first and second albums, in 2003 and 2004. She collaborated with Thalía in 2003 for her self-titled album Thalía. In 2004, DioGuardi co-wrote on six of the tracks off Kelly Clarkson's sophomore album Breakaway including Clarkson's hit "Walk Away". DioGuardi then worked with Australian singer, Ricki-Lee Coulter, on her 2005 single, Sunshine from her debut studio album, Ricki-Lee, which was released in October of that year. She also worked with Christina Aguilera on her album Back to Basics in 2006, co-writing twelve of the thirteen tracks on disc one of the album, among them being "Ain't No Other Man", and "Back in the Day". In the same year, she collaborated with Jesse McCartney on his album Right Where You Want Me, co-writing four songs called "Anybody", "Invincible", "Running Away" and "Feels Like Sunday".

In 2007, DioGuardi worked with many notable artists, one of whom was Britney Spears. DioGuardi wrote and produced "Ooh Ooh Baby" and co-produced "Heaven on Earth" on Spears' album Blackout. DioGuardi also contributed a majority of songs on Hilary Duff's fourth studio album, Dignity.

Since American Idol Season 8, DioGuardi returned to songwriting and producing, and has worked with number of artists, including Pink's "Sober," Kelly Clarkson's "I Do Not Hook Up," Cobra Starship's "Good Girls Go Bad," Katharine McPhee's "Had It All", Carrie Underwood's "Undo It", and Theory of a Deadman's "Not Meant to Be" among other new releases.

Among DioGuardi's projects is the song "Not Meant to Be", which appears on Theory of a Deadman's 2008 album, Scars & Souvenirs. DioGuardi co-wrote the song with lead singer Tyler Connolly, and is also featured as the love interest in the music video which was released on March 10, 2009. This was her debut in the music video industry.

In 2007, Dioguardi and Eurythmics member Dave Stewart wrote "Taking Chances" for Celine Dion.
It was released as the first single from the album Taking Chances in September 2007.
The song was a success around the world, peaking inside the top ten in Belgium, Canada, Denmark, France, Italy and Switzerland. It also peaked at number 40 on the UK Singles Chart, while on the Billboard Hot 100 chart, it reached number 54.

In 2009, DioGuardi wrote "If I Can't Have You" for Meat Loaf's 2010 album, Hang Cool Teddy Bear and recorded the vocal as a duet with Meat Loaf. She is also one of the writers for "Ghost", which was released as a single from Fefe Dobson's album Joy (2010). She wrote songs for Aussie singer Natalie Imbruglia's third studio album Counting Down the Days.

After taking a break from writing she wrote on Kelly Clarkson's "Heartbeat Song" which was the first single from Clarkson's seventh studio album Piece by Piece (2015). She wrote "Rebel Hearts" for Hilary Duff's Breathe In Breathe Out album in 2015.

Songs for film and television 
DioGuardi has also written for films and television series. She wrote "Brand New Day" for Camp Rock 2: The Final Jam, "We Rock" and "Play My Music" for Camp Rock, "He Could Be the One" for Hannah Montana, "Set This Party Off" for Jonas and "Someone Watching over Me" for Raise Your Voice. She has also written songs that have been used as themes such as "Taking Chances" on Glee, "Come Clean" on Laguna Beach: The Real Orange County, "Autobiography" on The Ashlee Simpson Show and "Ain’t No Other Man" on Alvin and the Chipmunks: The Squeakquel.

Music publishing 
DioGuardi co-owns Arthouse Entertainment, a publishing company that is a resource business for record companies and other music entities seeking compositions, productions, artists, and related music services. Arthouse has been a part of many chart-topping hits including B.O.B's "Nothin’ On You," Bruno Mars’ "Just The Way You Are" and "Grenade," Cee-Lo Green's "Forget You," Flo Rida's "Club Can’t Handle Me," Demi Lovato's "Heart Attack," Jason Derulo's "Want to want me" and "Trumpets," Eminem's "Monster," Zedd's "Beautiful Now," Jon Bellion's "All Time Low," Maroon 5's "Memories," Illenium's "Good Things Fall Apart," Halsey's "Graveyard,"Florida Georgia's Line "Simple," Ingrid Andress' "More Hearts Than Mine."

Reality television 
In July 2006, DioGuardi was a judge in an Idol-like TV show called The One: Making a Music Star. The show debuted on ABC with the second-lowest rating ever for a premiere on a major American network and was abruptly canceled after just two weeks.

In 2009, she joined the hit Fox television show American Idol as a fourth judge for the show's eighth season alongside judges Simon Cowell, Randy Jackson and Paula Abdul. She returned to Idol for its ninth season alongside Simon, Randy and new judge Ellen DeGeneres who replaced Paula Abdul after she quit the show in contract disagreements. However, she decided to leave the show on September 3, 2010, and did not return for the tenth season of Idol. It has since been stated that DioGuardi helped Steven Tyler become a judge on American Idol, after they worked together at DioGuardi's house in Los Angeles. She has had Idol connections in the past: in 2000, DioGuardi and former Idol judge Paula Abdul co-wrote the UK number-one single "Spinning Around", performed by Kylie Minogue. She has written many songs sung by Idol winners and alumni such as Kelly Clarkson, Allison Iraheta, David Archuleta, Carrie Underwood, Diana DeGarmo, Katharine McPhee, Kris Allen, Danny Gokey, and Adam Lambert. She co-wrote the American Idol season eight coronation single, "No Boundaries", which was performed by both finalists during the competition. DioGuardi struggled to find her place among the judges. In Richard Rushfield's book, "American Idol: The Untold Story," he reveals that often the other judges would leave the studio during commercial breaks, leaving DioGuardi behind to awkwardly sit by herself.

Kara also co-wrote with Jason Reeves a song called "Terrified" for Katharine McPhee's album Unbroken, which was covered by Didi Benami, an American Idol contestant from Season 9, during Hollywood week. DioGuardi also recorded a video of herself singing "Terrified" with Jason Reeves on YouTube, which currently has over 1,800,000 views. She appeared on Hannah Montana as herself in the episode "Judge Me Tender".

After leaving American Idol, she was a head judge on the Bravo singer-songwriter competition series Platinum Hit as of 2011.

Other projects 
DioGuardi guest starred as herself on The Simpsons and Sesame Street.

From September 5 – October 30, 2011, she made her Broadway debut as Roxie Hart in Chicago.

DioGuardi has also released an autobiography after her departure from "American Idol" named A Helluva High Note; Surviving Life, Love and American Idol.

Since 2012, she has taught a semester course called "Hitmaking with Kara DioGuardi" at Berklee College of Music in Boston. The course was developed specifically for the fall 2012 curriculum and paired 27 student songwriters and producers to mirror today's music industry practices.  One of her students was Charlie Puth.

In late 2017, DioGuardi helped launch the first Maine effort of a national program working to prevent child sexual abuse, the Enough Abuse Campaign (EAC).

Awards and nominations 
In 2003, DioGuardi won a BMI Cable Award for co-writing and performing "Somethin' To Say", the theme to the Lifetime Television series For the People, which starred Lea Thompson, Debbi Morgan, A. Martinez and Cecilia Suárez. Kara has been awarded 15 BMI Awards for having co-written the most performed songs on the radio. One of the industry's most highly sought after songwriters and producers, DioGuardi's songs have appeared on records that have sold more than 150 million copies combined. In 2007, DioGuardi was nominated for a Latin Grammy in the category of Song of the Year for her writing on the Belinda single, "Bella Traición" along with co-writers Belinda, Ben Moody, Nacho Peregrin and producer Mitch Allan.  In November 2007, Kara was awarded the TAXI A&R award for Humanitarian of the Year at their annual Road Rally Convention.

Discography

As a vocalist 
With MaD DoLL:
Mad Doll (1999)

With Platinum Weird:
Make Believe (2006)
Platinum Weird (2006)

As a featured artist:
"If I Can't Have You" on Meat Loaf's album "Hang Cool Teddy Bear" (2010)
"The Sun Will Rise" on Kelly Clarkson's album Stronger (2011)

Music videos
"Not Meant to Be" – Theory of a Deadman (2009)

Personal life 
DioGuardi splits her time between Los Angeles, California and York Harbor, Maine. She began dating teacher-turned-general contractor Mike McCuddy in 2007 after the two met while he was working on a home adjacent to her property in Maine. Following a year and a half of dating, DioGuardi and McCuddy became engaged in December 2008, and married on July 5, 2009 in Prospect Harbor, Maine. McCuddy has a teenage daughter from a previous relationship. Together, DioGuardi and McCuddy have one son, Greyson James Carroll McCuddy, born via gestational carrier on January 31, 2013. The couple made the decision to use a surrogate after years of infertility and unsuccessful in vitro fertilization attempts.

DioGuardi works with the Phoenix House, a non-profit substance abuse service organization; she contributes to recording studios in the facilities and helps teach the teens how to operate the equipment. In February 2010, she joined former American Idol contestant Elliott Yamin in a charity trip sponsored by ExxonMobil to Angola where they visited malaria prevention and treatment projects as part of Idol Gives Back.

In May 2010, she posed nude for the annual "Naked Truth" issue of Allure magazine.

Filmography

Television

Published works

References

Sources 

 Guest Co-host; (ABC Television) The View | October 15, 2009

External links 

[ Kara DioGuardi at All Music Guide]

Berklee College of Music's Songwriting Idol
LiveDaily – Platinum Weird's Dave Stewart and Kara DioGuardi interview

1970 births
American Idol participants
American musical theatre actresses
American people of Arbëreshë descent
Record producers from New York (state)
Songwriters from New York (state)
A&R people
Duke University Trinity College of Arts and Sciences alumni
Living people
Musicians from New Rochelle, New York
American people of Italian descent
Rocket Records artists
American women memoirists
21st-century American memoirists
21st-century American women writers
Writers from New Rochelle, New York
People from Ossining, New York
Berklee College of Music faculty
The Masters School people
21st-century American women singers
Television personalities from New Rochelle, New York
American women record producers
Women music educators
American people of Albanian descent
21st-century American singers
American women academics